"I Don't Care If the Sun Don't Shine" is a popular song written by Mack David.  It was originally written for the Disney animated feature Cinderella, but was not used in the final print.

The most popular version was recorded by Patti Page in 1950. The Page recording was issued by Mercury Records as catalog number 5396, and first reached the Billboard chart on May 20, 1950, lasting nine weeks and peaking at number 8. It was her first Top 10 hit. She recorded the song again in 1959 for her album, I'll Remember April.

Elvis Presley version

The song was one of the first 19 recordings by Elvis Presley for Sun Records. In 1954, "I Don't Care if the Sun Don't Shine" was the second Sun Records release by Presley, along with "Good Rocking Tonight" on the A-side. He recorded it in mid-September 1954, and the single was released on September 25.

Other cover versions
Dean Martin recorded the song for Capitol Records on March 28, 1950.

While there are no extant recordings, the song appears on several Beatles early pre-fame set lists.

In popular culture
A Dean Martin version of the song was featured in the 1953 film Scared Stiff starring Martin and Jerry Lewis. 

The Patti Page recording is featured in the movie The Adventures of Priscilla, Queen of the Desert. Guy Pearce also briefly sings excerpts of this song in the film, as does Terence Stamp and Hugo Weaving.

References

External links
 Patti Page version
 Elvis Presley version

1950 songs
Patti Page songs
Songs written by Mack David